Paul William Jackson (born 1 November 1961) is an Australian cricketer who represented Victoria and Queensland from 1985–99. He was part of Queensland's side when it won the Sheffield Shield for the first time during the 1994/95 season. In the Sheffield Shield final, Jackson took the catch for the final wicket which gave Queensland victory.

In his professional life he is a banking and finance executive. He was appointed to the board of Cricket Victoria in 2007.

Career
In 1987–88. Jackson won a man of the match award for a Victoria vs South Australia McDonald's Cup game, taking 4-26.

His best first class seasons were 1993-94 when he took 28 wickets at 43.57 and 1994–95 when he took 28 wickets at 32.32.

See also
 List of Victoria first-class cricketers

References

External links
Paul Jackson at Cricinfo
Paul Jackson at CricketArchive

Australian cricketers
1961 births
Living people
Cricketers from Melbourne
Victoria cricketers
Queensland cricketers
Australian cricket administrators
People from East Melbourne